DASB, also known as 3-amino-4-(2-dimethylaminomethylphenylsulfanyl)-benzonitrile, is a compound that binds to the serotonin transporter.
Labeled with carbon-11 — a radioactive isotope — it has been used as a radioligand in neuroimaging with positron emission tomography (PET) since around year 2000.
In this context it is regarded as one of the superior radioligands for PET study of the serotonin transporter in the brain,
since it has high selectivity for the serotonin transporter.

The DASB image from a human PET scan shows high binding in the midbrain, thalamus and striatum, moderate binding in the medial temporal lobe and anterior cingulate, and low binding in neocortex.
The cerebellum is often regarded as a region with no specific serotonin transporter binding and the brain region is used as a reference in some studies.

Since the serotonin transporter is the target of SSRIs used in the treatment of major depression it has been natural to examine DASB binding in depressed patients.
Several such research studies have been performed.

There are a number of alternative PET radioligands for imaging the serotonin transporter: [11C]ADAM, [11C]MADAM, [11C]AFM, [11C]DAPA,  [11C]McN5652, and [11C]-NS 4194.
A related molecule to DASB, that can be labeled with fluorine-18, has also been suggested as a PET radioligand. 
With single-photon emission computed tomography (SPECT) using the radioisotope iodine-123 there are further radioligands available: [123I]ODAM, [123I]IDAM, [123I]ADAM, and [123I]β-CIT.
A few studies have examined the difference in binding between the radioligands in nonhuman primates, 
as well as in pigs.

Other compounds that can be labeled to work as PET radioligands for the study of the serotonin system are, e.g., altanserin and WAY-100635.

Methodological issues 

The binding potential of DASB can be estimated with kinetic modeling on a series of brain scans.

A test-retest reproducibility PET study indicates that [11C]DASB can be used to measure the serotonin transporter parameters with high reliability  in receptor-rich brain regions.

When the DASB neuroimages are analyzed the kinetic models suggested by Ichise and coworkers can be employed to estimate the binding potential.
A test-retest reproducibility experiment has been performed to evaluate this approach.

Studies 
Besides the studies listed below a few occupancy studies have been reported.

References 

Treatment of bipolar disorder
Nitriles
Thioethers
PET radiotracers